John Stilley Carpenter (11 February 1849 at Centreville, Delaware – 3 January 1925 at Kanab, Utah) was a pioneer settler of Utah and fifth bishop of the LDS Church in Glendale, Utah (Kanab Stake) in Kane County, Utah.

Church and civil works
John Stilley Carpenter's family traveled via covered wagon train to Utah in 1857, crossing the Great Plains in Jacob Hoffhein's company.  They first located in Salt Lake City.  In 1866 Carpenter was ordained an Elder and was sent to the Missouri River to serve as a Church teamster assisting emigrants.  In 1868 he was called to the Muddy Mission (located in present-day Nevada), where he remained until that mission was disbanded in 1871. He then settled permanently in Glendale, Utah. On 4 August 1877 Apostle Erastus Snow ordained Carpenter as a High Priest.  In 1879 Carpenter became first counselor to Glendale Bishop Royal J. Cutler, which position he held until Cutler died in 1894. In September 1894 he became first counselor to Bishop Moses D. Harris, which position he held until March 1898. After that he served eight years as a member of the High Council. In 1908 Apostle Francis M. Lyman ordained him as Bishop of the Glendale Ward; he served for five years.  From 1881-1883 he filled a mission to the Southern states, serving part of the time as a conference president. For 25 years he served as a director in the Glendale Irrigation Company, and for 22 years was a member of the district school board.

Personal
Carpenter was a son of John Steele Carpenter and his wife Margaret McCullough, of New Castle County, Delaware. The Carpenter line descended from James Carpenter (c. 1666 - c. 1738) of Accomack County, Virginia and Sussex County, Delaware. On 1 February 1877 John Stilley Carpenter married Margaret E. Cutler (29 July 1860 - 12 September 1880); they had two children. On 10 January 1890 he married Ann Elizabeth Hopkins (February 1867 - ); they had four children.

References

External links

FamilySearch story on John Stilley Carpenter 1849 - 1925.
Latter-Day Saint Biographical Encyclopedia: A Compilation of Biographical Sketches of Prominent Men and Women in the Church of Jesus Christ of Latter-Day Saints (4 Volume Set) [Hardcover] March 27, 2012 publication, by Andrew Jensen, published by Greg Kofford Books Inc., 
Jacob Hofheins/Matthew McCune Company listing includes Carpenter, John Stilley, age 9.

1849 births
1925 deaths
19th-century Mormon missionaries
American leaders of the Church of Jesus Christ of Latter-day Saints
American Mormon missionaries in the United States
Mormon pioneers
People from Kane County, Utah
People from Centerville, Delaware
Latter Day Saints from Delaware
Latter Day Saints from Nevada
Latter Day Saints from Utah